The Synod of Cashel of 1172, also known as the Second Synod of Cashel, was assembled at Cashel at the request of Henry II of England shortly after his arrival in Ireland in October 1171. The Synod sought to regulate some affairs of the Church in Ireland and to condemn some abuses, bringing the Church more into alignment with the Roman Rite. As such it can be seen as a continuation and part of the Irish church reform of the Twelfth Century, with the first synod of Cashel, the Synod of Rathbreasail and the Synod of Kells, slowly embracing the Gregorian Reforms. The extent to which the Synod set the direction for the relationship between the English and the Irish Church has been the subject of scholarly debate. Stephen J. McCormick described the Synod as one of the most important events of this period of Irish history.

The Synod is not mentioned in Irish sources, so historians have had to rely on other sources, in particular Giraldus Cambrensis' (Gerald of Wales) account in Expugnatio Hibernicae (Conquest of Ireland). In his account of the Synod he lists the "constitutions" of the synods, "verbatim, as they were published".

The meeting of the Synod

Upon his arrival in Ireland, Henry went to Lismore. This was the see of Gilla Críst Ua Connairche (Christianus), who was native papal legate to Ireland. Henry also visited Cashel and Dublin, and thus had the opportunity to meet the archbishops Donnchad Ua hUallacháin of Cashel and Lawrence O'Toole of Dublin. According to Martin Holland, arrangements for a synod to meet at Cashel soon afterwards were put in place through these contacts. Giraldus lists these three bishops, as well as Cadla Ua Dubthaig, Archbishop of Tuam among the clergy of Ireland attending the synod, "with their suffragans and fellow-bishops, together with the abbots, archdeacons, priors, and deans, and many other Irish prelates". Gilla Meic Liac mac Diarmata (Gelasius), Archbishop of Armagh and Primate of Ireland, did not attend. According to McCormick he refused to attend. Giraldus relates that his absence was due to "infirmities and advanced age", and that he afterwards came to Dublin to give his assent "to the royal will in all these matters".

Acts of the Synod
Giraldus lists seven acts or "constitutions" of the Synod, here given in the translation of William Gouan Todd:

The seventh act
Giraldus lists these seven acts numbered as primo, secundus, etc. until septimus, as related in Todd's translation above. The last part of the seventh act concerns the relationship between the Anglican and the Irish Church. According to Marie Therese Flanagan, some historians have interpreted this as an actual decree of the synod, and have seen in it the origins of a policy of anglicisation of the Irish church pursued by the Angevin kings in Ireland. Thus, the synod of Cashel is often the starting point of any account of episcopal appointments in Ireland after the coming of the Normans and the extension of the electoral procedure of the English church to the Irish church is presumed to derive in principle from this decree. Flanagan, however, points out that, as it stands in Giraldus' account, this sentence refers only to the liturgical practices of the English church. She also questions whether this part is a part of the decrees of the synod, stating that "it appears to be rather Gerald's own comment on what would be attempted by Irish churchmen. Martin Holland does not include this part in his overview of the enacted decrees, but adds:It was also decided that in Ireland, all matters relating to religion were to follow the observances of the English church. Some have interpreted this as referring to liturgical practices only; others see it as encompassing more, and therefore being much more fundamental, especially since it is claimed that the Irish bishops swore fealty to Henry at around this time.

See also
 Synod of Rathbreasail (1111)
 Synod of Kells (1152)
 Roman Catholic Archdiocese of Cashel and Emly

References and notes

Notes

References

Bibliography

External links
English translation of Expugnatio Hibernica, recording the canons of Cashel II (p. 36-37)

Christianity in medieval Ireland
1172 in Ireland
1172 works
Norman invasion of Ireland
12th-century papal bulls
Cashel
Synods of Ireland
Cashel, County Tipperary
Holy See–Ireland relations